Torneutini is a tribe of beetles in the subfamily Cerambycinae, containing the following genera:

 Coccoderus
 Diploschema
 Dragomiris
 Dragoneutes
 Gigantotrichoderes
 Gnathopraxithea
 Lophoschema
 Macellidiopygus
 Praxithea
 Psygmatocerus
 Spathopygus
 Thaumasus
 Torneucerus
 Torneutes
 Torneutopsis
 Xenambyx

References

 
Cerambycinae